Uno sguardo dal ponte is an opera in two acts by composer Renzo Rossellini. The work uses an Italian language libretto by Gerardo Guerrieri which is based on Arthur Miller's play A View from the Bridge. The opera premiered at the Teatro dell'Opera di Roma on March 11, 1961 using a staging by Franco Rossellini, the composer's son. The premiere cast included Clara Petrella, Gianna Galli, Alfredo Kraus, Giuseppe Valdengo, and Nicola Rossi-Lemeni. The Philadelphia Lyric Opera Company presented the United States premiere of the opera on October 17, 1967 with Rossi-Lemeni as Eddie Carbone and Gloria Lane as Beatrice.

Roles
Alfieri (bass)
Eddie Carbone (baritone)
Louis (bass) 
Catherine (soprano)
Beatrice Carbone (soprano)
Tony (tenor)
Rodolfo (tenor)
Marco (bass)
Mike (tenor)
1 Immigration Officer (baritone)
2 Immigration Officer (tenor)
A woman (soprano) 
Old woman (mezzo-soprano)

References

Compositions by Renzo Rossellini
1961 operas
Italian-language operas
Operas
Operas based on plays
Operas set in the United States